Gerald Koh (许国欢, born 19 September 1984), better known by his stage name Boy Thunder, is a Singaporean radio personality. He once worked as a radio host for Singapore-based music station Hot FM 91.3 and hosted the evening show Taking You Home with Adam Piperdy and Joshua Simon from 4 - 7.30pm. In June 2014, he joined rival station 987 and hosted the night show "Itchy Pyjamas" from 8pm to 12 midnight. Currently, he is hosting "Get Up", along with Kimberly Wang from 6am-10am every weekday.

Biography
Koh attended Catholic Junior College after graduating from St. Gabriel's Secondary School. He also attended Ngee Ann Polytechnic, where he studied Mass Communication.

In March 2013, Boy Thunder, alongside Adam Piperdy, presented the longest marathon show in Singapore radio history, which lasted for 77 hours and 11 minutes with no breaks in between. The duo also managed to achieve a Guinness World Record for the Longest Marathon for a Radio Music Show DJ – Team.

Personal life
Koh is married to Thia Zhi Xin on 20 February 2016.

References

External links
 

1984 births
Living people
Ngee Ann Polytechnic alumni
Singaporean DJs